Elizabeth Latief born 27 March 1963, she is a former player of Indonesia from the 80s era.

Career 

She is a semi-finalist 1987 Badminton World Cup after being defeated Li Lingwei. Elizabeth won the 1987 Konica Cup in what is now the Singapore Open after beating Gu Jiaming from China in final and won Asian Badminton Championships 1987. In the 1983 Singapore she won a silver medal after being defeated by compatriot Ivana Lie. In 1985 Bangkok Thailand she managed to avenge himself by defeating Ivana Lie and won gold and women's singles, women's team and silver in woman doubles paired with Verawaty Fajrin lost to Rosiana Tendean / Imelda Wiguna. Then 1987 Jakarta Indonesia in the homeland she won the gold medal by defeating her junior Susi Susanti. Elizabeth is also trusted to strengthen the Uber Cup Indonesia team that year 1984, 1986, 1988. In final 1986 Indonesia lost 2–3 to China.

Personal life 

After retiring from the player, she manages the OCTIS advertising business with her brother. In 2004 Ice collaborated with Susi Susanti to manage "Fontana Sport Massage and Reflexology" in Kelapa Gading, North Jakarta. Now it has branches in Sunter, Juanda, Bogor, Pantai Indah Kapuk, Kedoya, Serpong and Alam Sutera.

Achievements

World Cup 
Women's singles

Southeast Asian Games 

Women's doubles

Women's singles

Invitational Tournaments 

Women's singles

References 

Indonesian female badminton players
1963 births
Living people
Asian Games medalists in badminton
Badminton players at the 1986 Asian Games
Asian Games bronze medalists for Indonesia
Medalists at the 1986 Asian Games
Southeast Asian Games gold medalists for Indonesia
Southeast Asian Games silver medalists for Indonesia
Southeast Asian Games medalists in badminton